Anne Gracie is an Australian author of historical romance novels. Her books have been shortlisted for the RITA Award and she has twice won the Australian Romance Writer of the Year award and National Readers Choice Award (USA). She lives in Melbourne, Victoria.

Bibliography

The Marriage of Convenience 

 Marry in Haste (#1)
 Marry in Scandal (#2)
 Marry in Secret (#3)
 Marry in Scarlet (#4) – winner, Favourite Historical Romance, 2020 Australian Romance Readers Awards

The Chance Sisters 
 The Autumn Bride (#1)
 The Winter Bride (#2)
 The Spring Bride (#3)
 The Summer Bride (July 2016) (#4)

The Devil Riders 
 The Stolen Princess (#1)
 His Captive Lady (#2)
 To Catch a Bride (#3)
 The Accidental Wedding (#4)
 Bride By Mistake (#5)

The Merridew Sisters 
 The Perfect Rake (#1)
 The Perfect Waltz (#2)
 The Perfect Stranger (#3)
 The Perfect Kiss (#4)

External links 
 Anne Gracie Official Website
 Anne Gracie - Goodreads

References 

Historical romance novels
Australian romantic fiction writers
Women romantic fiction writers
Living people
Year of birth missing (living people)